Kilma Sibimoat Lattin (October 30, 1978) is a Native American leader, businessman, and military veteran. He is a member of the Pala Band of Mission Indians in San Diego, California, where he was elected to multiple terms of office on both the Executive Committee and the Tribal Council between 2006 and 2012.

Early life and education
Lattin was born in La Jolla, part of San Diego, California He spent part of his early childhood in La Jolla and part on the Pala Indian Reservation. He graduated from La Jolla High School in 1996. He earned a Bachelors Degrees in History from UC Santa Barbara in 2002. While in college he served in the Army Reserve Officers' Training Corps. Lattin earned a Masters of Business Administration from the Marshall School of Business in cooperation with University of Southern California.

Family military heritage 
Lattin's family has served in the military for multiple generations. His maternal great-grandfather was a World War I (WWI) pilot. Simultaneously in WWI, his maternal grandfather, Colonel Thomas George Lanphier Sr., a graduate of the United States Military Academy at West Point in 1914, was also serving in WWI in the Army Air Corp stationed in France. Lanphier Sr., was one of three men to ever fly the Spirit of St. Louis during his time as the Commander of Selfridge Field, Michigan. An uncle, Colonel Thomas George Lanphier, Jr. is partially credited as having shot down the plane carrying Admiral Yamamoto, killing the mastermind of the Pearl Harbor attack. Lattin's paternal grandfather, Roy A. Lattin, Sr., was a Private First Class in the United States Marine Corps (USMC) and fought in the Battle of Guadalcanal.

Military career
Lattin joined began his military service in the U.S. Army as both a Non-Commissioned Officer, Sergeant, and Cadet in the Reserve Officer Training Corps. As a Sergeant, Lattin's first station was in the 3-140th Aviation, a CH-47 Chinook Company located in Stockton, California. In 2002, Lattin earned a full commission as an Aviation Officer in the United States Army's Air Cavalry, the 1-18th AIR CAV based out of Los Alamitos, California. Lattin was eventually qualified to fly the OH-58 Kiowa and the AH-64 Apache attack helicopter. He served in the 145th Aviation Regiment, 1-18th AIR CAV at Fort Rucker, and was honorably discharged in 2006 for a service-related knee injury.

Soldier's Medal 
In April 2003 while en route to a flight school training session at Fort Rucker, Lattin saw a woman on the side of the road who was engulfed in flames. This was later revealed to have been caused by to an accident with a gas mower. The woman had panicked and run, causing the flames to spread. Lattin jumped out of his vehicle and saved her life by pushing her to the ground and extinguishing the flames with his body and the freshly-mowed grass. During this incident, Lattin sustained 2nd-degree burns over his face, arms, and neck. He was recognized for the deed with a Distinguished Citizen Award by the City of Enterprise, Alabama, and presented with the Soldier's Medal for Valor by the Commanding General Officer of Fort Rucker, the U.S. Army's flight school.

Native American leadership and advocacy

Tribal leadership 
Starting in 2006, Lattin held various leadership roles on the Pala Reservation, including a position in the Tribal Council, various boards, and in delegations to the National Congress of American Indians and National Indian Gaming Commission. In 2012, he worked with Principal Deputy Assistant Secretary of Indian Affairs John Tahsuda to draft domestic policy positions for the 2012 Presidential Campaign.

Pala Skatepark 

In 2007, Lattin led an effort to raise $600,000 and hired skatepark architect Wally Hollyday to design and build a new 22,000-square-foot skatepark that included bowls, ramps, rails, and a kidney-shaped pool within the existing Pala Reservation sports complex.
Completed in 2018, the Pala Skatepark was featured in the touring exhibition "Ramp It Up: Skateboard Culture in Native America" which showed at the Smithsonian's National Museum of the American Indian Washington, D.C. location and its New York City location in 2009 and 2010, with a national tour in 2012-2015.

Native American veterans advocacy 

Lattin founded the Pala Veterans Organization which provides Pala veterans with a community and meeting schedule which has provided a much-needed outlet in which to share their experiences with other veterans, and subsequently conceived of and produced a documentary titled, Defending The Homeland about their service in the military. It won a Regional Emmy Award in 2013.

See also

 KPRI, the first Native-American-owned radio station in southern California
 List of Native Americans of the United States
 Harvard Business School, Executive Education

References

Living people
1978 births
Native American leaders
Pala Band of Mission Indians politicians
Recipients of the Soldier's Medal
Regional Emmy Award winners